Tongatapu 5 is an electoral constituency for the Legislative Assembly in the Kingdom of Tonga. It was established for the November 2010 general election, when the multi-seat regional constituencies for People's Representatives were replaced by single-seat constituencies, electing one representative via the first past the post electoral system. Located in the central-western part of the country's main island, Tongatapu, it encompasses the villages of Kanokupolu, Haʻatafu, Kolovai, Haʻavakatolo, ʻAhau, Foʻui, Teʻekiu, Masilamea, Nukunuku, Matafonua, Matahau, Vaotuʻu, Fahefa, Kalaʻau, Haʻutu, and ʻAtata.

Its first ever representative in 2010 was ʻAisake Eke, who was not a member of any political party, and was a first time MP. Of Tongatapu's ten constituencies, Tongatapu 5 was the only one not to be won by the Democratic Party of the Friendly Islands, but Eke was viewed as a pro-democracy independent close to the party, and had even considered running as a party member. For the 2014 election, he did exactly that, and retained his seat, this time for the Democratic Party. Eke lost the seat to Losaline Ma'asi in 2017, but regained it at the 2021 election.

Members of Parliament

Election results

2014

2010

References

Tongan legislative constituencies
Tongatapu
2010 establishments in Tonga
Constituencies established in 2010